The R729 road is a regional road in County Carlow and County Wexford in Ireland. It connects the R702 near Borris to the R714 near New Ross,  to the south (map of route).

The government legislation that defines the R729, the Roads Act 1993 (Classification of Regional Roads) Order 2019 (Statutory Instrument 577 of 2019), provides the following official description:

Borris, County Carlow — New Ross, County Wexford

Between its junction with R702 at Barmona in the county of Carlow and its junction with R714 at Macmurroughsisland in the county of Wexford via Coolnamara and Glynn in the county of Carlow: Pollmounty Bridge at the boundary between the county of Carlow and the county of Wexford: and Ballynabanoge in the county of Wexford.

See also
Roads in Ireland
Motorways in Ireland
National primary road
National secondary road
Trunk Roads in Ireland
Road signs in Ireland

References

Regional roads in the Republic of Ireland
Roads in County Wexford